Circles Around Me is an album by American bluegrass mandolin player Sam Bush, released through Sugar Hill Records in October 2009.

Reception 

The album earned Bush a Grammy Award nomination for Best Bluegrass Album.

In his Allmusic review, music critic William Ruhlman wrote that the album "makes a good demonstration of Sam Bush's continuing mastery of the mandolin and his own niche in the bluegrass scene."

Track listing
"Circles Around Me" (Jeff Black, Sam Bush) – 3:55
"Diamond Joe" (Traditional) – 3:40
"You Left Me Alone" (Tom Gray, Jerry Stuart) – 3:07
"The Old North Woods" (Bush) – 4:10
"Roll on Buddy, Roll On" (Teddy Wilburn, Doyle Wilburn) – 2:41
"The Ballad of Stringbean and Estelle" (Bush, Guy Clark, Verlon Thompson) – 4:45
"Blue Mountain" (Bush) – 6:09
"Out on the Ocean" (Pete Kuykendall) – 2:54
"Gold Heart Locket" (Black) – 4:17
"Junior Heywood" (Bush, Edgar Meyer) – 6:36
"Midnight on the Stormy Deep" (Traditional) – 3:52
"Apple Blossom" (Traditional) – 1:35
"Souvenir Bottles" (Bush, John Cowan, Stephen F. Brines) – 8:23
"Whisper My Name/Hot Tamales" (Ebo Walker) – 7:23

Personnel
 Jerry Douglas - resonator guitar
 Cornelia Heard - violin
 Byron House - acoustic bass, electric bass
 Courtney Johnson - banjo
 Del McCoury - guitar, vocals
 Edgar Meyer - bass
 George Meyer - violin
 Stephen Mougin - guitar, mandolin, vocals
 Scott Vestal - banjo

References

2009 albums
Sam Bush albums
Sugar Hill Records albums